Billy Brittain is an Australian professional rugby league footballer who last played as a  for St. George Illawarra in the NRL.  

He previously played for the South Sydney Rabbitohs in the National Rugby League.

Career

2018
Brittain joined South Sydney in 2018 but spent the entire season playing for the club's then feeder side and foundation club North Sydney.

Brittain was selected to play for the NSW Residents team against the Queensland residents midway through the year.  At the end of the season, Brittain was named as North Sydney's best and fairest player.

2019
At the start of 2019, Brittain remained in the Canterbury Cup NSW side for Souths and was selected to captain the NSW Residents side against Queensland for a second consecutive year.

Brittain made his NRL debut in round 12 of the 2019 NRL season for South Sydney in their 26-14 loss to the Parramatta Eels.

On 9 September 2019, Brittain was named the Canterbury Cup NSW player of the year.
On 29 September 2019, Brittain was named in the 2019 Canterbury Cup NSW team of the season.

2020
On 20 February 2020, Brittain signed a contract to join St. George Illawarra for the 2020 NRL season.
Brittain made his debut for St. George Illawarra in round 1 of the 2020 NRL season against the Wests Tigers at WIN Stadium.

2021
On 16 September, it was announced that Brittain had been released by St. George Illawarra.

References

External links
St George Illawarra Dragons profile

1994 births
Australian rugby league players
South Sydney Rabbitohs players
North Sydney Bears NSW Cup players
Rugby league hookers
Living people
St. George Illawarra Dragons players
Sunshine Coast Falcons players